In the 1944–45 season, USM Alger is competing in the Second Division for the 8th season French colonial era, as well as the Forconi Cup. They competing in First Division, and the Forconi Cup.

Competitions

Overview

League table

Group B

Matches

Playoff

Forconi Cup

References

External links
 L'Echo d'Alger : journal républicain du matin
 Alger républicain : journal républicain du matin

USM Alger seasons
Algerian football clubs 1944–45 season